Velo-city is a series of cycle planning conferences that started in 1980 in Bremen. The name Velo-city is a small play on word using the French for bicycle – vélo, and Velo-city can also be read as velocity or speed. European Cyclists’ Federation owns the series name, and the ECF Board is the decision-making body for Velo-city.

At the beginning, the conference guests and speakers were mainly bicycle advocates, but today Velo-city is known for gathering people who are involved in the policy, promotion and provision for cyclists. This mixture of people, professions, skills and experience is a valuable component of the events' success. Velo-city is a forum, with people such as stakeholders from local, regional and national authorities, politicians, academics, consultants, industrials, and bicycle users.

Velo-city is an occasion for a city to show continuous and lasting efforts to improve cycling in its city. For instance Paris, inspired by the Velo-city 2003 conference, launched Velib in 2007, thereby creating world-wide attention.

Objectives
The objectives of the Velo-city series are:
 Spread high quality knowledge, good new information about cycling, and transport planning at the international level.
 Cities with good cycling policies showcase the benefits they provide to their citizens, businesses and others through the conference generated publicity.
 Encourage the recognition of cycling as an efficient, healthy, environmentally-friendly mode of transport, and to promote its greater use.
 Integration of cycle planning into transport, land-use planning and other relevant policy sectors where cycling plays an important role.
 Seek involvement from all relevant stakeholders.

Hosting the conference
The conference is hosted by a different city each year. Before the corona pandemic, it was held with odd-numbered years held in Europe and even-numbered years held outside of Europe. Cities bid to host the conference and are selected by the ECF Board.

Conferences have been held in these locations with the following themes:

 1980 – Bremen, Germany
 1984 – London, United Kingdom
 1987 – Groningen, Netherlands, "Planning for the urban cyclist"
 1989 – Copenhagen, Denmark, "How to make people use the bicycle"
 1991 – Milano, Italy, "The bicycle: improving mobility and the environment in our cities"
 1992 – Montreal, Canada
 1993 – Nottingham, United Kingdom
 1995 – Basel, Switzerland, "The bicycle, symbol of sustainable transport"
 1996 – Ferrara, Italy
 1997 – Barcelona, Spain
 1999 – Graz, Austria and Maribor, Slovenia
 2001 – Edinburgh and Glasgow, Scotland
 2003 – Paris, France
 2005 – Dublin, Ireland, "Delivering the vision"
 2007 – Munich, Germany
 2009 – Brussels, Belgium
 2010 – Copenhagen, Denmark
 2011 – Seville, Spain
 2013 – Vienna, Austria
 2014 – Adelaide, Australia
 2015 – Nantes, France
 2016 – Taipei City, Taiwan
2017 – Arnhem and Nijmegen, Netherlands "Freedom of Cycling"
2018 – Rio de Janeiro, Brazil
2019 – Dublin, Ireland, "Cycling for the Ages" 

Next conferences:

2021 – Lisbon, Portugal "Cycle Diversity"
2022 – Ljubljana, Slovenia "Smart Cycling Inclusion"
2023 – Leipzig, Germany
2024 – Ghent, Belgium

Velo-city 2017 
Velo-city returns to the Netherlands with Velo-city 2017 in Arnhem-Nijmegen region. With the theme "Freedom of Cycling", this edition of Velo-city will focus on 5 subthemes:
 Infrastructure: Learn, experience, and put it into practice
 People: Different people, different ideas, different choices
 Bikenomics: Cycling saves and generates money
 Urban planning: Cycling in a digitalizing world
 Governance: How do they do it?

Important dates

Velo-city Global 2016
Taipei, Taiwan Velo-city Global 2016 makes its first visit to Asia, in the Bicycle Kingdom – Taiwan.

Themes
 Evolution of Cycling

Velo-city Global 2014
Adelaide Velo-city Global 2014 celebrated what is great about bike riding. This was explored by conference delegates through three key themes and greater depth was achieved by looking at these themes through four key lenses.

Themes
 Setting the stage – places and spaces
 Tales worth celebrating – people, communities and journeys, and
 Celebrations to come – cultural change.
Lenses
 Lens 1 – The Facts
 Lens 2 – Leadership
 Lens 3 – Policy, strategy, planning and partnerships
 Lens 4 – Creativity and Innovation

Conference venue

Opened in June 1987, the Adelaide Convention Centre was the first purpose-built convention centre in Australia.  The last day of the conference was held at the Adelaide Town Hall.

Program

The full conference program for Velo-city Global Adelaide 2014 had a mix of key note speakers, concurrent session topics involving more than 170 presenters, social activities, tours and workshops.

Keynote and plenary speakers included: Bojun Bjorkman-Chiswell, Ethan Kent, Florian Lennert, Glen Koorey, Jan Garrard, Janette Sadik-Khan, Jennifer Bonham, Lawrence Frank, Manfred Neun, Maria Vassilakou, Mikael Colville-Andersen, Niels Hoé, Per Ankersjö, Peter Eich, Steven Fleming, Timothy Papandreou, Tim Blumenthal.

Fellow bike enthusiast, comedian, radio host, mathematician and author Adam Spencer was the master of ceremonies at the Velo-city Global conference.

Key dates

Velo-city 2013

More than 1400 delegates gathered from all continents for the largest cycling-themed conference, the Velo-city 2013, held in Vienna, Austria from 11 to 14 June. Building on established Velo-city discourse topics such as mobility, ecology and climate, health, the economy, resources, time and space, and social policy, the motto of the Velo-city 2013 conference, which took place in the Rathaus, was framed as “The Sound of Cycling – Urban Cycling Cultures“ with three main themes: cycling cultures, cycling cities, and cycling benefits.

Aims
Vienna is a growing cycling city that aims to raise the bicycle's modal share from the current 6% (2011) to 10% by 2015. Hosting the premier international cycling planning conference, Velo-city was therefore considered to be of great importance to reach this goal. In addition, the City Government of Vienna has declared 2013 the Year of Cycling in order to improve public opinion on cycling, to make urban cycling more attractive, and to convince more people in Vienna of the advantages of cycling as everyday mode of transport. Moreover, the Vienna Cycling Week took place in the week of the conference, offering various side events not only for Velo-city participants but also for the wider public.

Program
Amongst the subsessions such as lectures, podium discussions, round tables, lightning talks, and workshops participants were offered several inspiring plenary sessions and panel discussion as well as the so-called Speed Dating – Dating Cycle.

Monika Jones, international journalist and presenter at Germany's global TV broadcaster ‘Deutsche Welle’ was not only the Master of Ceremony but also chaired numerous sessions during the conference.

Plenary and panel discussion speakers included: Maria Vassilakou, Michael Häupl, Amanda Ngabirano, Stephen Yarwood, Dave Horton, Alain Flausch, Lenore Skenazy, Mikael Colville-Andersen, Shipra Narang Suri, Ulrich Syberg, Manfred Neun, Georg Hauger, Milan Ftacnik, Morten Kabell, Jacques Garreau, Randy Neufeld, Alec Hager, Michael Cramer, Hep Monatzeder, Sabine Kubesch, Per Ankersjö, Bernhard Ensink, Niki Berlakovich, Mathieu Grosch, Siim Kallas, Marijke van Haaren, Philippe Crist, Ursula Zechner, Roman Bartha, Doris Bures.

Memorandum of Mayors’ Cycling Summit
Mayors and Vice Mayors of 16 cities signed the Vienna Cycling Summit Memorandum on 12 June 2013 in order to promote smart and intelligent cities, good places for people to live in, and to call for actions to promote inspiration, participation and interaction of citizens of all ages and walks of life in issues of sustainable urban development. Mayors and Vice Mayors aim to meet common urban trends such as individualization, digitalization, increasing diversity, new lifestyles as well as public health, climate protection and energy efficiency. One related key feature in their cities therefore is intermodal mobility and cycling as are discovered mobility culture.

Velo-city 2013 EXPO
The Velo-city 2013 EXPO was an integral part of the conference with the booths completely integrated into the congress venue. The exhibitors varied from cycling policy, cycling infrastructure planning and expertise centers to bicycle industry, other cycling friendly businesses and cities or other authorities related to cycling policy.

Velo-city Global 2012 

The Velo-city Global 2012 took place in Vancouver, Canada from 26 to 29 June 2012 at the Sheraton Vancouver Wall Center Hotel. After Copenhagen in 2010, this was the second Global Edition of the Velo-city conference series. The Conference brought together around 950 participants including 150 speakers and 155 exhibitors.

The City of Vancouver has been voted as the World's Most Liveable City by The Economist three years in a row, from 2008–10 and the city itself has displayed a steady commitment to making Vancouver a cycle-friendly city. According to its Greenest City Action Plan, Vancouver has a vision of being the greenest city in the world by 2020. Green Transportation is one of the 10 goal areas, with two main targets:
 make over 50% of trips on foot, bicycle and public transit
 reduce distance driven per resident by 20%

The conference was held under the motto “Cities in Motion”, following the ambition to bring together cycling cities from all around the world in order to share best practices for becoming cycling-friendly cities.

Aims

The City of Vancouver and European Cyclists' Federation, as organizers of Velo-city Global 2012, sought to highlight the achievements of Vancouver as a cycling ‘starter’ city and bring forward European cycling experience, including its fast growth as a mode of transportation, to North America, to the Pacific Rim countries and globally. The primary goal was to bring all relevant stakeholders to Vancouver in order to share best practices for encouraging cycling as a means of transport.

To this effect, Velo-city Global 2012 was held with the following goals:
 Spread knowledge of quality, positive, evolving information about cycling and transport planning
 Provide valuable publicity for cities that have good cycling provision networks
 Encourage the recognition of cycling as an efficient, healthy, environmentally friendly means of transport and recreation
 Further the integration of cycling planning into transport and land-use planning, and other relevant sectors
 Seek involvement from all relevant stakeholders, including environment, health and business sectors
 Provide a wide range of real-world examples of cycling as form of transportation, with benefits to the environment, personal health and economy.

Program

The program of Velo-city Global 2012 was spread over four days and included plenaries, sub-plenaries and concurrent presentations in different formations: lectures, symposiums, workshops, roundtables or Pecha Kucha sessions. Cycling guru Gil Peñalosa was the Master of Ceremonies while significant stakeholders and cycling advocates were among the keynote speakers.

The full list of keynote speakers is: Gil Peñalosa, Alain Ayotte, Ayfer Baykal, Chang Hsin-Wen, Jerry Dobrovolny, Bernhard Ensink, Aske Wieth-Knudsen, Suzanne Lareau, Manfred Neun, Bob Paddon, Mayor Wan-Su Park, Gordon Price, Mayor Gregor Robertson, Niels Tørsløv, Paul Tranter, Maria Vassilakou, Mayor Stephen Yarwood, Rick Antonson, Adam Bodor, Dale Bracewell, S. K. Jason Chang, Rodney Ellis, Joop Goos, Michel Labrecque, Kevin Mayne, Randy Neufeld, Sten Møller, Gabriel Lagos, Brent Toderian.

Velo-city Global 2012 Vancouver was launched with central theme "Cities in Motion", which expressed the idea of gathering all those cities and regions around the world with great cycling records in Vancouver and having share their stories, inspirations and successes. The program was developed within nine themes in mind.

Core themes
1. Leadership – the politics of change
2. How cycling achieves community aspirations and addresses global problems
3. Essential elements – increasing cycling and safety
4. Empowering people and inclusivity
5. Emerging technologies

Pivotal themes
1. Public Bike Sharing Systems
2. Combined mobility – Cycling integration with Transit, Rail and other Modes
3. Cycling logistics – Movement of goods by bicycle
4. Cycling Tourism

Part of the program was a bike parade of a 9 km route in the heart of the City of Vancouver starting from and ending at the Sheraton Vancouver Wall Centre by going around False Creek through the Burrard Bridge and the Olympic Village. A series of side events were held in the Museum of Anthropology at the University of British Columbia, at Cecil Green Park House, on Salt Spring Island while an evening event was offered to all the delegates at the Law Courts building in the neighbourhood of the venue.

During Velo-city Global Vancouver, the Cycling Embassy of Denmark announced its yearly “Cycling Leadership Award”, this year going to Randy Neufeld, Director of SRAM Cycling Fund for his dedication to cycling promotion. It was the third time that the Danish Cycling Embassy awarded high-profile figures of cycling advocacy. Mayor Michael Bloomberg and Lake Sagaris have received the award the previous two years.

Velo-city Global 2012 Expo

The Velo-city Global 2012 Exhibition was an integral part of the conference with the booths installed in the foyer of the venue among the session rooms where lunch and beverages were offered during the breaks. The exhibitors varied from cycling policy, cycling infrastructure planning and expertise centers to bicycle industry, other cycling friendly businesses and cities or other authorities related to cycling policy.

The Charter of Vancouver 
The City of Vancouver and European Cyclists’ Federation launched the Charter of Vancouver on Children and Cycling with the expectation that the Charter serve as a legacy for the city and the Velo-city Global 2012 conference. The Charter is based on the United Nations 1990 Convention on the Rights of the Child and outlines the important connection between children and cycling. It recognizes children's rights worldwide, the special capability that cycling has to enshrine these universal rights and a commitment from the signatories to call for the adoption of goals, policies, and practices toward promoting cycling as a means to further recognize and promote the rights of children. It is addressed to the Secretary-General of the United Nations calling upon him to adopt targets in order to promote active and safe mobility for people of all ages and abilities, especially children. The Charter remains open to signatures by institutions who are interested in using it as a tool for the promotion of children's right to safe cycling.

Velo-city 2011 

The Velo-city 2011 took place in Seville, Spain from 23 to 25 March 2011 at the Barceló Renacimiento hotel. The conference gathered over 900 participants, and 120 speakers. It featured prominent speakers, such as Gro Harlem Brundtland (former Prime-Minister of Norway, author of the UN's influential ‘Brundtland Report), and also saw the unveiling of the Charter of Seville.

The Velo-city 2011 Seville was the first Mediterranean Velo-city conference in a Spanish-speaking country. So, it set its main focus on the Mediterranean area, North Africa as well as Latin America. The city of Seville, being Spain’s second hottest place, turned out to be a connection to countries with high temperatures where people cycling in such a climate have to face different challenges as ECF has documented in its work.

The central theme of Velo-city 2011 Seville “The Cycle Of Life – El Ciclo De La Vida” referred to the bicycle as a part of everyday life and a source of well-being for people of any age in more inhabitable cities and regions.

Aims

As the moto of the conference (The Cycle of Life) declares, Velo-city Seville primarily aimed at advancing the role of bicycle as part of everyday life and a source of well-being for people of any age in more inhabitable cities and regions.

The Velo-city 2011 in Seville intended to show how a city in the southernmost area in Europe is also possible to invert priorities in favour of sustainable transport and make a significant contribution to the necessary battle against climate change.

Last but not least, the Velo-city 2011 in Seville aimed at drafting and launching the Charter of Seville in preparation for the International Transport Forum 2011 in Leipzig, Germany.

Program

The program of Velo-city 2011 Seville was spread in four days and included both plenary and sub-plenary sessions in different formation: presentations, round tables or workshops. The plenary sessions hosted significant keynote speakers like Gro Harlem Brundtland and Gil Peñalosa who was the Master of Ceremonies.

A full list of keynote speakers is: Francesca Racioppi, Enrique Jacoby, Francesco Tonucci, Lynn Sloman, Pilar Vega, Eva Willumsen, Patrick Kayemba, Joaquín Nieto.

Theme areas of Velo-city 2011 Seville:
 By Bike, Towards A Healthier City: Cycling as a healthy means of transport – improving the health of citizens and cities alike
 Learning About Non-Motorised Cities: Lifelong learning – improving our mobility habits
 Public Investment For A Better Life: The efficiency of cycling investments on sustainable transport and mobility
 Economy And Employment: Cycling As A Livelihood – the social component of the economics of cycling, a source of employment and development.

A car-free day and a bike parade followed in the end of the conference, inspired by the Latin American car-free Sunday “Ciclovida”.

The Ciclovida programme was organised in the framework of Velo-city Seville and included a series of 5 bicycle events from November 2010 until March 2011 (7 November, 12 December, 16 January, 20 February, 27 March). Ciclovida consists of temporal opening of city streets to its inhabitants, so that they can make the most of a safe, free and lay place for recreation and sport, providing full access to pedestrians and cyclists. By providing the opportunity to exercise, it is considered to prevent illness, to recover and enjoy public spaces, to promote peaceful co-existence, respect, social cohesion and environmental awareness, and to help citizens to acquire healthy habits, to improve air quality and to reduce noise in cities. Thus, it was connected to the theme area of “Healthier City” and the conference's moto “The Cycle of Life”.

Velo-city 2011 Expo

The Exhibition during the Velo-city conference was an integrated part of the conference. The parties presented at the exhibition space were from the different fields of cycling policy, cycling infrastructure planning & expertise centers, bicycle industry and other cycling friendly businesses and networks.

The Charter of Seville 
The Charter of Seville was launched during Velo-city 2011 in preparation for the International Transport Forum held in Leipzig, Germany in May 2011. The document aimed at the national and transnational level underlining the benefits of cycling as a daily mode of transport, citing improved health, reduced traffic congestion, significantly cheaper infrastructure, and lowered transport emissions among many other advantages. Rather than setting targets, it demanded an overarching and broad political commitment from recognizing the bicycle as a viable mode of transport. The charter specifically called upon all Ministers of Transport convening at the ITF “to promote cycling at international level and to invest substantially in cycling in their own countries during the years to come”.

Velo-city Global 2010 

The Velo-city 2010 was the first Velo-city Series conference in its global edition and it took place in Copenhagen, Denmark on 22 – 25 June 2010 at the Øksnehallen and CPH CONFERENCE. It was organised by the European Cyclists' Federation, the City of Frederiksberg and the City of Copenhagen. ECF celebrated the 30 years of the Velo-city Series by initiating the biennial global edition of the conference. The Velo-city Global 2010 gathered 1100 participants and highlighted the bicycle's potential to enhance the quality of life around the world and to solve global challenges such as congestion, obesity and climate change. It was connected with the brand of Copenhagen as the climate change city following the 2009 United Nations Climate Change Conference.

The overall theme of Velo-city 2010 Copenhagen was “Different Gears, Same Destination” expressing the main idea of the conference that despite our differences, we are all heading in the same direction: people from different backgrounds, at different stages and different all share the same goal – getting more people cycling throughout the world. The different background of the participants from all around the world was seen by the organisers as a driving force behind the conference to join forces across continents, regions and cities.

Aims

The Velo-city Global 2010 aimed to show and develop the potential of cycling as an obvious choice on urban transport and a concrete measure in combatting climate change. Additionally it provided inspiration and ideas to concrete actions, whatever the challenges to cycling were. It also aimed to create a platform for the exchange of ideas and experiences across borders and across disciplines. The more than 1100 participants came from very different backgrounds, were at different stages with very different challenges, but the vision for all was clear: getting more people to cycle. All in all, Velo-city Global 2010 in Copenhagen brought together urban planners, politicians, NGOs and bicycle professionals from around the world to discuss the potential and challenges of cycling.

Program

The program of Velo-city Global 2010 was spread over four days and included both plenary and sub-plenary sessions. Each day of the conference started and ended with a plenary session in order to ensure common ground across the variety of backgrounds and experiences. The total 180 sub-plenary sessions ranged in a variety of formats: roundtables, workshops.

The speakers ranged from politicians and experts to Urban Planners to PR Officers with much international experience in local NGOs. Coming from big cities like Shanghai, Santiago, New York to smaller ones like Malmö, Girona and Varde.

A full list of the keynote speakers is: Bo Asmus Kjeldgaard, Connie Hedegaard, Ciarán Cuffe, Frank Jensen, Gil Peñalosa, Jan Gehl, Janette Sadik-Khan, John Whitelegg, Lake Sagaris, Mikael Colville-Andersen, Pan Haixiao, Vandana Shiva.

Each plenary session dealt with one of the following themes:
 Cycling as quality of life
 Co-benefits of cycling
 Social status of cycling
 Cycling as democracy and freedom
 Global status of cycling initiatives
 Creative cycling innovations
 Collaboration for the Future
 Cycling and global responsibility

The third day of Velo-city Global 2010, a Bike Parade took place which attracted almost 2000 cycling conference goers and Copenhageners. The parade concluded an impressive sight of many people in all forms, shapes and colours moving slowly through the streets of Copenhagen on their bicycles.

Velo-city Global 2010 Expo

The exhibition was an integrated part of the Velo-city Global 2010. It was based around the plenary room, accessible by the participants during track-free moments, lunch and coffee breaks. Some exhibitors used the chance to get bigger booths while a new trend was developed: more and more cities stated the wish to be present at the next Velo-city's Expo.

Velo-city 2009 

The Velo-city 2009 took place in Brussels, Belgium on 12 – 15 May 2009 at Tour & Taxis. The site is a former industrial storage depot which has been fully restored and is now used for all sorts of events from major fairs through music festivals to exclusive parties. The Conference was organized by ECF and Brussels Capital Region and gathered more than 750 participants.

Aims
By organizing this event, ECF aimed at gathering a large range of cycling stakeholders such as local authorities, politicians, industrials, professionals and bicycle users. Being in Brussels added a European value with the implication of European authorities and thus bring cycling on the European Agenda.

The Brussels-Capital Region's main aims for Velo-city are to present a high-quality cycling infrastructure and to obtain renewed recognition for the role of the bicycle within a sustainable intermodal transport policy (cycling in combination with public transport and journeys on foot), along with the positive impact of cycling on health and the environment.

On a regional level, the authorities intended Velo-city 2009 to increase the number of cyclists in Brussels by getting as many of the city's inhabitants to participate in the conference as possible. To do this, several high-profile campaigns and events were organised to accompany the conference.

Program
Velo-city 2009 had a promising program to offer. Beside 4 plenary and 28 sub-plenary sessions with well-known national and international speakers, there were two excursions to Liège and Ghent. A permanent exhibition named Velo-city Expo was organized and then on Sunday took place the Brussels traditional bicycle festival, Dring Dring.

Theme-titles of the plenary sessions:
 Visions to transport in future cities
 Intermodal urban transport
 A forerunner city
 A climber city
 Health and cycling
 Climate change and urban transport
 Peak oil and cycling
 Economy and cycling
 City planning and communication
 Successful marketing of cycle use
 Cycling to school
 What can we learn from the advertising world?
 Role of Europe
 Debate with Members of EU Parliament

Plenary speakers:
Antonio Tajani, Pascal Smet, Manfred Neun, Prof. David Banister, George Amar, Jean-Luc de Wilde d’Estmael, Tjeerd Herrema, Mayor Alain Juppé, Mayor Sam Adams, Francesca Racioppi, Prof. J-P Van Ypersele, Jörg Schindler, Philip Darnton, Helle Søholt, Frank van den Eeden, Paul Robison, Guillaume Vanderstichelen, Siim Kallas,  Mayor Klaus Bondam, Antonio Rodriguo Torrijo, Margus Hanson, Michael Cramer, Saïd El Khadraoui, Reinhard Rack

Dring Dring
Dring Dring is a cycling event that has been organized for the Brussels-Capital Region since 1995 by Pro Velo, bringing together all the Brussels cycling associations (Gracq, Fietsersbond, les Ateliers de la rue Voot, Cyclo). The objectives of this all-bicycle week, taking place in May, are to encourage people to use bicycles more regularly, even inordinately, when travelling in Brussels, and to ensure better standing for cyclists in the city.

The organization of Dring Dring 2009 was connected with the Velo-city Brussels and took place from 11 to 17 May. It was the last Dring Dring to be organized as the event was replaced by the Bike Experience.

Velo-city 2009 Expo
The Velo-city Expo and the Velo-city Conference 2009 in Brussels gave an overall idea of all the topics worldwide, with regard to the cycling world. The exhibitors, speakers and participants formed a large forum for all cycling issues. The exhibition was the biggest demonstration of the members of the cycling world, with representatives from the industry, urban and transport planning institutions, volunteers and politicians.

The Expo was divided into four sections:
 Products
 Cycling infrastructure, expertise + information
 Cycling friendly world
 Cycling policy – European bodies, umbrella federations and alliances

The Charter of Brussels 
During Velo-city's 2009 last day in the European Parliament, several European cities signed the Charter of Brussels. By signing the charter, cities commit themselves to invest in bicycle policy as an integrated part of urban mobility. At the same time, the charter is a call on the European Union to promote urban cycling.  Among the key demands are a 15% bicycle modal share by 2020 and reducing bicycle road fatalities by 50%.

The cities of Helmond (Netherlands), Seville (Spain), Copenhagen (Denmark), Brussels (Belgium), Reggio Emilia (Italy), Varna (Bulgaria), Tartu (Estonia), Budapest (Hungary) and Munich (Germany) were the first signatories of the Charter. Up to date, more than 60 cities have signed the Charter of Brussels while the process remains open for interested authorities.

References

External links 

 Velo-city Global 2014
 Velo-city Global 2016 – CI/VI
 Velo-city Global 2016 – website

Cycling conferences
International conferences